Nicholas Coles is a British-American scholar.

Nicholas Coles may also refer to:

Nick Coles, English cricketer
Nicky Coles (born 1972), New Zealand rower

See also
Nicholas Cole (disambiguation)
Coles (surname)